The Transitional Government of National Unity (TGNU), also commonly called the Interim Government, was the interim government of South West Africa (Namibia) from June 1985 to February 1989.

Background
Following the 1975–1977 Turnhalle Constitutional Conference, the first multiracial elections were held in the occupied territory in 1978, and a National Assembly as well as a Council of Ministers was constituted. Dirk Mudge became chairman of the ministerial council. Already in 1972 the United Nations had decreed SWAPO to be the "sole legitimate representative" of Namibia's people, but SWAPO was not invited to the Turnhalle conference and boycotted the subsequent elections. The United Nations Security Council consequently declared the election null and void, and the interim government illegitimate.

Following interference by the South African Administrator-General the Council of Ministers resigned, and on 18 January 1983 South Africa accepted the dissolution of both the legislative and the executive body without elections being scheduled, and again assumed full administrative authority over South West Africa.

The subsequent void was filled by South African administrators. Willie van Niekerk was appointed administrator-general for South West Africa and Jan F Greebe became chief executive officer. A Judicial Commission was appointed. Urged by United Nations Security Council Resolution 532 to speed up the process of releasing the territory into independence, a State Council was established in May 1983. In September this Council was obsoleted by the establishment of the Multi-Party Conference (MPC) which consisted of 19 parties but again excluded SWAPO. The MPC issued the Windhoek Declaration of Basic Principles in 1984 and the Bill of Fundamental Rights and Objectives, wherein the establishment of a Transitional Government of National Unity is requested from the South African administration, in 1985.

Setup
On 17 June 1985, the Transitional Government of National Unity was installed by the South African Administrator-General. Its legislative and executive actions were subject to South African approval, with newly appointed administrator-general Louis Pienaar having the veto right on all legislation to be passed. The TGNU was perceived as a client government of South Africa that sought moderate reform but was unable to secure recognition by the United Nations.

The body was dominated by the Democratic Turnhalle Alliance (DTA), then an alliance of ethnically based, unelected political parties. The interim government consisted of a 62-seat National Assembly and an 8-seat Council of Ministers. The seats were allocated such that the DTA had 22, and five smaller parties got 8 seats each: Labour Party (LP), the National Party of South West Africa (NP), the Rehoboth Free Democratic Party, the South West Africa National Union (SWANU), and the SWAPO Democrats (SWAPO-D). The position of the DTA was, however, not as strong as in the previous government after the 1978 elections where it occupied 41 out of the 50 seats. This time, the five smaller parties could easily outvote the DTA.

On 1 March 1989, as part of the Tripartite Accord (1988), the TNGU was suspended along the terms of United Nations Security Council Resolution 435 for it to give way to an independent government, determined by the November 1989 parliamentary elections. SWAPO won the elections but fell short of a two-thirds majority which would have enabled it to write the constitution on its own.

Cabinet
TGNU was chaired on a three-month round robin basis by its cabinet members.

References

Notes

Literature

Government of Namibia
History of Namibia
Lists of political office-holders in Namibia
1985 establishments in South West Africa
1989 disestablishments in South West Africa
States and territories established in 1985
States and territories disestablished in 1989